The California Firefighters Memorial is a memorial located on the grounds of the California state capitol in Sacramento, California.  It honors firefighters from California or who served in California and who died in line of duty or of other duty-related illness or injury. A memorial ceremony is held each year to honor firefighters who died in the line of duty. This ceremony is usually in late September.  It includes a limestone memorial wall and two bronze statues: "Fallen Brother" and "Holding the Line";  it was designed by the Jerde Partnership.  The memorial is in the Capitol Park between 13th and 14th Streets and is managed by the California State Capitol Museum.  A "California Firefighters Memorial Fund" was created which received proceeds from the California Motor Vehicles Department from sales of special vehicle license plates, under a program established by Section 18802 of the California Revenue and Taxation Code.  It also received donations designated for the Fund received by the California Franchise Tax Board in state income tax filings, and from calendar sales.

In 2015, sixteen firefighters' names were added to the Memorial.

Tragedy prompts safety 
The memorial honors Cal Fire firefighters and numerous others from various other municipal and wildland firefighting agencies, who have died from duty-related causes, some medical in nature, and others which occurred on-duty while directly engaged in an emergency incident. Typically these on-duty incident related deaths are analyzed and examined more closely than deaths from other medical reasons.  Improvements in firefighting safety derived from case-studies of fatal firefighter incidents may be regarded as memorials, too.  For example, flame resistant nomex clothing and upgraded training were required for Cal Fire employees  after Steve Arrollado was burned in the Bell Valley fire. The wildland fire shelter was mandated for all Cal Fire firefighters after the Spanish Ranch fire in 1979, and it was redesigned and improved after the disastrous South Canyon fire near Glenwood Springs, CO. in 1994. The 1990 death of Kenneth Enslow prompted use of the "Look Up, Look Down" safety training program for Cal Fire employees. A variety of firefighting air tanker crashes eventually led to wider inspections and removing the oldest and most vulnerable large air tankers from the national wildland firefighting fleet.

Firefighter fatalities memorialized
Names included on the California Firefighter Foundation's memorial wall as part of the California State Capitol Museum, Sacramento, CA. can be found here.  Notable among these is James J. Kenney.

See also
 List of firefighting monuments and memorials

References

External links
 Fallen Firefighters list
 California Firefighters Memorial

Firefighting memorials
Firefighting in the United States